Alphonse Lemerre (Canisy, Normandy, France, 1838 – Paris, France, 1912) was a 19th-century French editor and publisher, known especially for having been the first to publish many of the Parnassian poets.

Life

Alphonse Lemerre was the eighth child of his parents. In 1850, at age 12, he was an errand-boy in Saint-Lô. In 1860, he moved to Paris and quickly rose to prominence, becoming the "Prince de l'édition" (Prince of Publishing) and made his publisher's mark famous, which had the Latin motto Fac et spera ("Agis et espère" in French, "Do and Hope" in English). He opened a library at 23 passage Choiseul. His library occupied also other odd number addresses (23-33, 47).

In 1865, he began to edit Parnassian poets in Louis-Xavier de Ricard's revue L'Art, which had ten issues between November 2, 1865, and January 6, 1866. The November issue had an article by Paul Verlaine about Baudelaire. In 1866, Lemerre published Le Parnasse contemporain, a collection of new poetry, in 18 weekly installments from 30 March to 30 June 1866, the collected installments published in October. Two other volumes of Le Paranasse Contemporain appeared in 1871 and 1876.

He went on to publish numerous collections. Lemerre's publications include many of the chefs-d'œuvre of 19th century French literature and history: Anatole France, Auguste Molinier, Louis Petit de Julleville; la Petite Bibliothèque littéraire, la Bibliothèque des curieux, la Bibliothèque illustrée, la Bibliothèque dramatique, la Petite collection pour la jeunesse, les poèmes nationaux, des livres d'enseignement and other collections.

He was a mayor of Ville d'Avray, a Republicain in politics, anticlerical. He was very attached to his native Normandy. He went there often (to Canisy, to the Château de Montmirel and to Coutainville) and had several properties there (Dangy, Dais, Méterville).

In 1965, the inheritors of his estate closed the Lemerre publishing house.

Selection of authors edited by Alphonse Lemerre
Alphonse Lemerre is especially known for having published Parnassian poets. But he also published Classical and Romantic authors and anthologies.

Théophile Gautier
Théodore de Banville
Charles Marie René Leconte de Lisle
François Coppée
Léon Dierx
José-Maria de Heredia
Jean Lahor
Victor de Laprade
Catulle Mendès
Sully Prudhomme
Paul Verlaine
Alfred de Musset
Renée Vivien

Collections:  
Le Parnasse contemporain, recueil de vers nouveaux. I- 1866, II- 1869-1871, III- 1876

Anthologies:
Anthologie des poètes français depuis les origines jusqu'à la fin du XVIIIe siècle.
Anthologie des poètes français, XIXe siècle.
Sonnets et eaux fortes, 1869, premier livre de peintres paru en France grâce au critique d'art Philippe Burty.
Le Livre des Sonnets.
Le Livre des Ballades.

External links

French editors
French publishers (people)
1838 births
1912 deaths
French male non-fiction writers